The commune of Bugenyuzi is a commune of Karuzi Province in central Burundi. The capital lies at Bugenyuzi.

Notable people
 Clotilde Niragira, head of three different ministries under Pierre Nkurunziza.

References

Communes of Burundi
Karuzi Province